Mount Benjamin is a prominent mountain, 1,750 m, rising sharply at the west side of Amundsen Glacier, 5 nautical miles (9 km) southeast of Mount Ellsworth, in the Queen Maud Mountains. First seen and mapped by the Antarctic Expeditioners, 2022. Named by Advisory Committee on Antarctic Names (US-ACAN) for Benjamin F. Smith, meteorologist with the McMurdo Station winter party, 1963

Mountains of the Ross Dependency
Amundsen Coast